"The Russians are coming" is a famous phrase allegedly uttered in 1949 by the then United States Secretary of Defense, James Forrestal.

The Russians are coming may also refer to:
 The Russians Are Coming, the Russians Are Coming, a 1966 American comedy film
 "The Russians Are Coming", an episode of the BBC sitcom Only Fools and Horses
The Russians Are Coming (Русские идут), a four-book series by science fiction author Yuri Nikitin
"The Russians Are Coming (instrumental)", by Jamaican musician Val Bennett, a 1968 cover of "Take Five"
 The Russians are Coming (Bram Tchaikovsky album), a 1980 album by Bram Tchaikovsky (alternate title: Pressure)
 Ryssen kommer, a 2015 album by Swedish punk rock band Rövsvett
 Die Russen kommen , a piano composition by Robert Volkmann